Hasanlu Rural District is in Mohammadyar District of Naqadeh County, West Azerbaijan province, Iran. At the National Census of 2006, its population was 5,184 in 1,165 households. There were 4,436 inhabitants in 1,260 households at the following census of 2011. At the most recent census of 2016, the population of the rural district was 3,875 in 1,229 households. The largest of its 26 villages was Hasanlu, with 1,277 people.

References 

Naqadeh County

Rural Districts of West Azerbaijan Province

Populated places in West Azerbaijan Province

Populated places in Naqadeh County